Jingle All the Way is a 2002 Christmas album by Crash Test Dummies.

Track listing

Personnel
Brad Roberts - vocals on "White Christmas," "Jingle Bells," "God Rest Ye Merry Gentlemen," "We Three Kings," "The First Noel," and "Good King Wenceslas", electric guitar on "The Little Drummer Boy" and "The First Noel," baritone ukulele on "Jingle Bells"
Ellen Reid - vocals on "O Little Town of Bethlehem," "In the Bleak Midwinter," "We Three Kings," "Little Drummer Boy," "The First Noel," "Silent Night," "Good King Wenceslas," and "The Huron Carol"
Dan Roberts - bass guitar
Chris Brown - Hammond organ, Wurlitzer piano, universal organ, piano
Kenny Wollesen - drums, percussion, chimes, sleigh bells,  timpani on "Little Drummer Boy," tom tom on "Little Drummer Boy"
Andrew Hall - upright bass
Scott Harding - guitar, percussion, finger snaps on "God Rest Ye Merry Gentlemen"
Bob Hoffnar - pedal steel guitar on "O Little Town of Bethlehem" and "Silent Night"
Jane Scarpantoni - cello on "In the Bleak Midwinter" and "The Huron Carol"
Jerry Dodgion - flute on "God Rest Ye Merry Gentlemen," piccolo on "Good King Wenceslas"
Ming Xiao-Fen - pipa on "We Three Kings"
Stuart Cameron - acoustic guitar on "We Three Kings" and "Good King Wenceslas"
James Ross - trumpet on "Little Drummer Boy," piccolo trumpet on "Good King Wenceslas"
Brian Harding - trombone on "Little Drummer Boy," and "Good King Wenceslas"
Javier Gandara - french Horn on "Little Drummer Boy," and "Good King Wenceslas"

Reception

The album received a fairly positive review.

References

External links

Jingle All The Way
Jingle All The Way
Christmas albums by Canadian artists
Covers albums
Alternative rock Christmas albums